di20 (to be read diventi, Italian for "you become", a pun on the age of the artist on its release date) is the second studio album by Italian singer Francesca Michielin, released by Sony Music Italy on 23 October 2015 and produced by Michele Canova. A new edition of the album was released on 19 February 2016 with the title di20are and four new tracks, including the single Nessun grado di separazione.

Track listing

di20

di20are

Chart performance

di20

di20are

Certifications

References

2015 albums
Francesca Michielin albums
Sony Music Italy albums